Symphysanodon andersoni,  the  buck-toothed slopefish, is a species of marine fish found in the Western Indian Ocean.

Etymology
The fish bears the name William D. Anderson Jr. in recognition of his research on Symphysanodon, his examination of this species, and his sharing of his findings with Kotthaus. Anderson, Jr. works at the Grice Marine Biological Laboratory in Charleston, South Carolina.

References

Percoidea
Taxa named by Adolf Kotthaus
Fish described in 1974